The Isle of Man Representative County football team is the IOMFA football team of the Isle of Man and is controlled by the Isle of Man Football Association. The team plays in a yellow and red home kit and an all navy blue away kit.

History 

The Isle of Man are not members of FIFA or UEFA, as the Isle of Man FA are members of The Football Association (The FA), with similar status to an English county. Since they are not a member of either FIFA or UEFA, they are not eligible to enter either the World Cup or European Championship. The Isle of Man therefore is limited to different forms of competition. The main competition the Isle of Man national football team takes part in is the biennial Football at the Island Games tournament. Isle of Man has won the tournament once, and came in runner-up four times.

They play in the International Quadrangular Tournament, a tournament for semi-professional and amateur national teams from the Isle of Man, Scotland, the Republic of Ireland and Northern Ireland. They won the tournament in 2000, beating Scotland 1–0 in the final, despite the Isle of Man possessing the only truly all-amateur set-up while the other teams fielded semi-professional players.

Another regular competition played in is the Steam Packet Football Festival, which usually features the Isle of Man along with lower division teams from The Football League. The Isle of Man's best result to date in the tournament, was beating Burnley F.C. 1–0 in 2000.

In the 2005–06 season, the Isle of Man national team won The FA National League System Cup, a competition for amateur teams representing the leagues at Step 7 of the National League System with a few other leagues permitted by the FA. The Isle of Man beat the Cambridgeshire Football Association County League team 4–0 in the final and represented England in the UEFA Regions' Cup.

In 2014, a new team, Ellan Vannin, was created by the Manx Independent Football Association in order to enter ConIFA and compete at the ConIFA World Football Cup. As opposed to the official Isle of Man team, which is composed only of Isle of Man Football League players, Ellan Vannin will allow only those with Manx ties to play for them, in line with FIFA eligibility rules. Initially, the IoMFA was reluctant to allow MIFA to run the Ellan Vannin side, but the two associations agreed to work together in February 2014 to allow both the IoMFA side and Ellan Vannin to continue.

Tournament records

Island Games record 

N.B. Football was not played at the 2019 games due to lack of pitches in Gibraltar. A replacement tournament was held in Anglesey where the side came 3rd.

Selected Internationals opponents 
Last update: 10 July 2009

References

External links 

Isle of Man with all results on roon.ba-Non_Fifa
Isle of Man on www.fedefutbol.net
Isle of Man representing England at the UEFA Regions' Cup on uefa.com
Isle of Man playing against San Marino B-National-Team (with squad) on thefa.com

F
National team
European national and official selection-teams not affiliated to FIFA
Amateur association football teams
1993 establishments in the Isle of Man
Sports organizations established in 1993